Sione is a given name and a surname. It may refer to:

Given name

A – K
Sione Asi (born 1998), New Zealand rugby union player
Sione Fakaʻosilea (born 1987), Tongan rugby union player
Sione Faletau (born 1988), Tongan rugby union player
Sione Faumuina (born 1981), New Zealand rugby league player
Sione Feingatau ʻIloa (born ?), Tongan politician
Sione Fifita (born 1990), Tongan rugby union player
Sione Finefeuiaki (born 1979), Tongan rugby league player
Sione Fonua (born 1980), Tongan rugby union player
Sione Fua (born 1988), American football player
Sione Havili (born 1998), New Zealand rugby union player
Sione Houma (born 1994), American football player
Sione Jongstra (born 1976), Dutch triathlete
Sione Kalamafoni (born 1988), Tongan rugby union player
Sione Katoa (disambiguation), several people

L – S
Sione Latu (born 1971), Tongan-born Japanese rugby union player
Sione Lātūkefu (1927–1995), Tongan historian and reverend
Sione Lauaki (1981–2017), Tongan-born New Zealand rugby union player
Sione Lea (born 1987), Tongan rugby union player
Sione Lousi (born 1989), New Zealand rugby league player
Sione Mafileo (born 1993), New Zealand rugby union player
Sione Masima  (born 1993), Australian rugby league player
Sione Mata'utia (born 1996), Australian rugby league player
Sione Misiloi (born 1994), New Zealand rugby union player
Sione Molia (born 1993), New Zealand rugby union player
Sione Ngū Manumataongo ( Fatafehi Tuʻipelehake; 1922–1999), Tongan prince, politician, poet, and composer
Sione Piukala (born 1985), Tongan rugby union player
Sione Po'uha (born 1979), American football player, coach, and businessman
Sione Sangster Saulala (born 1974), Tongan broadcaster, politician, editor, and schoolteacher
Sione Sialaoa (born 1956), Samoan weightlifter and Olympics competitor

T – Z
Sione Tahaafe (born 1958), Tongan rugby union player
Sione Taione (born 1971), Tongan politician
Sione Takitaki (born 1995), American football player
Sione Taufa (born ?), American rugby league player
Sione Teaupa (born 1992), Tongan-born Japanese rugby union player
Sione Timani (born 1984), Tongan rugby union player
Sione Tongia (born ?), Tongan rugby league player
Sione Tovo (born 1988), Tongan rugby league player
Sione Tui (born 1999), Australian rugby union player
Sione Tuʻamoheloa (born 1980), Tongan rugby union player
Sione Tuihalamaka (born 1991), American football player
Sione Tuipulotu (disambiguation), several people
Sione Vailahi [see: The Barbarian (wrestler)] (born 1958), Tongan-born American wrestler
Sione Vailanu (born 1995), Tongan rugby union player 
Sione Vaiomoʻunga (born 1989), Tongan rugby union player
Sione Vatuvei (born 1983), Tongan-born Japanese rugby union player
Sione Vaveni Taliaʻuli (born ?), Tongan-born Australian boxer and Olympics competitor
Sione Vuna Fa'otusia (born 1953), Tongan politician

Surname
Alesana Sione (born 1966), Samoan weightlifter and Olympics competitor
Eric Sione (born 1992), New Zealand rugby union player
Faalelei Sione (born 1996), Australian rugby union player
Joan Sione (born 1986), New Zealand rugby union player
Lusi Sione (born ?), New Zealand rugby league player
Tomu Sione (1941–2016), Tuvaluan politician

In fiction
Sione Tapili, a main character in the New Zealand animated series bro'Town (2004–2009)

See also
Sioned, an unrelated Welsh given name with a similar spelling
Sione's Wedding, a 2006 comedy film